Razvigor Peak is the peak rising to 1110 m in Srednogorie Heights on Trinity Peninsula, Antarctic Peninsula.  Situated 2.49 km west-southwest of Mount Ignatiev, 3.7 km south-southwest of Corner Peak, 6.86 km east-southeast of Hanson Hill, 2.68 km northeast of Ledenika Peak and 11.76 km north of Sirius Knoll.  Surmounting Malorad Glacier to the north and Russell West Glacier to the south.

The peak is named after the settlement of Razvigorovo in northeastern Bulgaria.

Location
German-British mapping in 1996.

Maps
 Trinity Peninsula. Scale 1:250000 topographic map No. 5697. Institut für Angewandte Geodäsie and British Antarctic Survey, 1996.
 Antarctic Digital Database (ADD). Scale 1:250000 topographic map of Antarctica. Scientific Committee on Antarctic Research (SCAR), 1993–2016.

References
 Bulgarian Antarctic Gazetteer. Antarctic Place-names Commission. (details in Bulgarian, basic data in English)
 Razvigor Peak. SCAR Composite Antarctic Gazetteer

External links
 Razvigor Peak. Copernix satellite image

Mountains of Trinity Peninsula
Bulgaria and the Antarctic